L27 or L-27 may refer to:
 L27 domain, a protein domain
 60S ribosomal protein L27
 Buick L27 engine, a V6 automobile engine
 Cessna L-27, a light utility aircraft of the U.S. Air Force
 , a submarine of the Royal Navy
 , a sloop of the Royal Navy
 Klemm L 27, a German training aircraft
 Lectionary 27, a medieval Greek manuscript